Oxlip is an unincorporated community in Isanti County, Minnesota, United States.  The community is located within Spencer Brook Township and Bradford Township.

The community is located at the junction of Isanti County Road 5 and Roanoke Street NW.  State Highway 47 (MN 47) is nearby.  Oxlip is located west of Isanti and near Bradford.

References

 Official State of Minnesota Highway Map – 2013/2014 edition

Unincorporated communities in Minnesota
Unincorporated communities in Isanti County, Minnesota